Shuremy Felomina (born 4 March 1995) is a Curaçaoan professional footballer who plays as a centre back for Real Lunet.

References

External links 
 

1995 births
Living people
Association football defenders
Curaçao footballers
Tweede Divisie players
Derde Divisie players
CRKSV Jong Holland players
FC Den Bosch players
Achilles '29 players
Kozakken Boys players
FC Lienden players
VV DUNO players
KFC Houtvenne players
Curaçao under-20 international footballers